Alžběta Anna Zelingrová (born 27 January 1995 in Prague as Alžběta Baudyšová) is a Czech curler.

Career
Zelingrová joined the Czech national women's curling team as the alternate in 2013. Her first international event was when the team played in the 2014 World Women's Curling Championship where the Czech Republic went 3–8. In 2016 they played in the 2016 Europeans and finished in fourth place, which also qualified them for the 2017 World Women's Curling Championship. There, they finished with a 5–6 record. At the 2017 Euros, they finished with a 3–6 record, qualifying once again for the World Championship. At the 2018 World Women's Curling Championship, the Czech team qualified for the playoffs for the first time with a 6–6 record. They then lost the qualification game 7–3 to Russia's Victoria Moiseeva. The 2018 Europeans were not successful for the Czechs as they did not qualify for the World Championship. The following season, they would qualify for the Worlds, after going 3–6 at the 2019 European Curling Championships. The 2020 World Women's Curling Championship was cancelled due to the COVID-19 pandemic, but the team represented Czech Republic at the 2021 World Women's Curling Championship which was played in a bio-secure "bubble" to prevent spread of the virus. There, they finished in twelfth place with a 3–10 record.

Personal life
She is currently employed as a teacher. Previously, she was a student at Charles University in Prague. Her sister, Michaela Baudyšová, is also a curler. She married Jan Zelingr in August 2022.

Teams

Women's

Mixed

Mixed doubles

References

External links
 
 
 
 Czech national women team (2016) - Czech Curling Federation  (web archive)
 
 Kubešková returns to world stage in Saint John - Curling Canada – 2014 Ford World Women's Curling Championship

Living people
1995 births
Sportspeople from Prague
Czech female curlers
Czech curling champions
Competitors at the 2019 Winter Universiade
Curlers at the 2012 Winter Youth Olympics
21st-century Czech women
Charles University alumni